Johannes Bruyn (February 21, 1750 – February 10, 1814) was an American politician from Ulster County, New York.

Early life
Bruyn was born on February 21, 1750, in Shawangunk, New York. He was a son of Jacobus Bruyn and Jane (née Graham) Pruyn (d. 1764). Among his siblings was elder sister Gertruyd Bruyn (the wife of Cornelius DuBois), twin brothers Severyn Tenhout Bruyn (also a New York Assemblymen) and Jacobus S. Bruyn (also a New York Assemblymen and member of New York State Senate; married Margaret DeWitt, a daughter of  Andries J. DeWitt and Blandina Elmendorf Ten Eyck; father of Andrew DeWitt Bruyn), sister Mary Bruyn (wife of Nicholas Hardenberg), and brother Cornelius Bruyn (also a New York Assemblymen).

Career
For a long time he was a judge of Ulster County and "enjoyed the esteem and confidence of the community; was a man of sound judgment, sterling integrity, and unwavering in his principles."
 
In April 1781, Bruyn was elected as a New York Assemblymen representing from Ulster County in the 5th and 6th New York State Legislatures and serving from July 1, 1781, until June 30, 1783. After two years, he was succeeded by John Cantine. He was a presidential elector for New York in 1792. In April 1796, he was again elected to the Assembly, this time as a Democratic-Republican, and served in the 20th New York State Legislature from July 1, 1796, to June 30, 1797, when he was replaced by his brother Jacobus. Two years later, Johannes replaced Jacobus in the Assembly. Johannes served in the 23rd New York State Legislature from July 1, 1799, to June 30, 1800. 

In April 1809, he was elected as a Democratic-Republican to a four-year term in the New York State Senate for the 33rd New York State Legislature, and by virtue of that office a member of the Court of Errors. His seat was one of the 7 representing the Middle District which then consisted of Dutchess, Orange, Ulster, Columbia, Delaware, Rockland, Greene and Sullivan counties. Bruyn served in the 34th, 35th, 36th New York State Legislatures until June 30, 1813. In 1812, he was chosen as a member of the Council of Appointment.

Personal life
On April 10, 1783, Bruyn was married to Margaret DeWitt (1758–1827), a daughter of Blandina (née DuBois) DeWitt and Col. Charles DeWitt, who served as a delegate to the Continental Congress. Margaret's brother Gerrit was the father of Charles G. DeWitt, a U.S. Representative who was appointed the U.S. Chargé d'Affaires to Guatemala by Andrew Jackson. Her sister Maria "Polly" DeWitt, was the wife of Jacobus "James" Hasbrouck, a prominent Kingston merchant. In addition, Margaret was a niece of Andries DeWitt and a first cousin of Jenneke DeWitt (the wife of Johannes' brother Jacobus). Together, they were the parents of:

 Charles DeWitt Bruyn (1784–1849), a New York Assemblyman who married his cousin, Maria Hasbrouck (1793–1851), a daughter of James Hasbrouck and Polly (née DeWitt) Hasbrouck.
 Cornelius Bruyn (1789–1873), the president of the Ulster County Bank who married Sarah Amelia Bevier, one of seven daughters of Capt. Philip DuBois Bevier and Ann (née DeWitt) Bevier. After her death in 1861 from stomach cancer, he married Catherine Van Vleck, a daughter of James Van Vleck of Shawangunk.

Bruyn died in Shawangunk, New York, on February 10, 1814.

References

1750 births
1814 deaths
Members of the New York State Assembly
New York (state) state senators
Burials in New York (state)
18th-century American politicians
19th-century American politicians
1792 United States presidential electors
De Witt family
Bruyn family